Adam Miller (born 1979 in Eugene, Oregon), is an American painter based in New York. He is known for his large-scale paintings inspired by baroque and mannerist art. He studied at the Florence Academy of Art, Michal John Angel Studios, Art Students League of New York and the Grand Central Academy of Art.

In 2017 he unveiled a monumental painting named Quebec, which depicts prominent people from the history of Quebec and Canada. It was commissioned by the Montreal businessman Salvatore Guerrera.

References

External links
 Official website

1979 births
21st-century American painters
American contemporary painters
American male painters
Living people
Painters from Oregon
Artists from Eugene, Oregon